Slovenski Javornik is a settlement in the Municipality of Jesenice in the Upper Carniola region of Slovenia. Commonly known simply as Javornik, the place name is derived from the Slovene word javor 'maple'.

Primarily a residential community, it also contains the bulk of the remaining steel mill facilities in the Municipality of Jesenice. The settlement is located directly southeast of the core of Jesenice, on the north bank of the Sava River. Its neighbor to the northwest is the village of Koroška Bela.

History
Javornik was founded in 1403 when Ulrich, the bishop of Brixen, granted Herman Esel the rights to mine iron ore below Koroška Bela. After an ore discovery, blast furnaces were established on the right bank of Javornik Creek, below Kres Hill. Javornik was the third iron-working settlement in the modern Jesenice area, after Sava and Plavž, although all were predated by the agricultural villages of Koroška Bela and Murova.

The industrial facilities passed through the hands of several owners, including the Pasarelli family, who built a manorhouse at Trebež in the 17th century. Now lost, it was one of four "ironworks castles" built in the area during the 16th and early 17th centuries; the Kos Manor in Murova and the Bucelleni-Ruard Manor in Sava survive. In 1752, the Javornik furnaces were among other facilities in the area purchased by the Tarvisio merchant and investor Michel Angel Zois de Edelstein, the father of the Slovene Enlightenment patron Baron Sigismund Zois.

After the Ljubljana-Tarvisio railroad was laid through Jesenice in 1870, the KID company—by then the sole operator of the steel mill—began relocating its plants, up to then scattered throughout the region, to Sava and Javornik. In 1904, the sheet-metal rolling plant was transferred from Jesenice to Javornik; a decade later, during World War I, the plant and its workers were moved to Trieste and Pula to work on the Austro-Hungarian Navy.

In 1929, the Javornik facilities were purchased by the Westen brothers, August (1877–1952) and Adolf (1878–1960), who built a new light sheet-metal rolling plant, coming online in 1933. After the war, Yugoslav authorities oversaw a substantial expansion of the steel facilities; the settlement was incorporated into Jesenice in 1945.

Places of note in Javornik include the sprawling Acroni steel mill complexes, and a large bridge over the Sava leading to Blejska Dobrava, a small train station on the Ljubljana line.

References

External links

Slovenski Javornik on Geopedia

Populated places in the Municipality of Jesenice